Patrick Anthony Kivlehan (born December 22, 1989) is an American professional baseball outfielder who is currently a free agent. He has played in Major League Baseball (MLB) for the San Diego Padres, Cincinnati Reds, and Arizona Diamondbacks.

Career
Kivlehan played both college baseball and college football at Rutgers University. In his four years of football at Rutgers, he played in 43 games as a backup defensive back, recording 40 tackles and one interception. After his college football career ended after his senior season, he joined Rutgers baseball team. In his one season of baseball, he hit .392/.480/.693 with 14 home runs, 50 runs batted in (RBI) and 24 stolen bases in 51 games. For his play he was named the Big East Player of the Year.

Seattle Mariners
Kivlehan was drafted by the Seattle Mariners in the fourth round of the 2012 MLB draft. He made his professional debut that season for the Everett AquaSox.

In 72 games, he hit .301/.373/.511 with 12 home runs and 52 RBI. Kivlehan started the 2013 season with the Clinton LumberKings. After hitting .283/.344/.386 and three home runs in 60 games with Clinton, he was promoted to the High Desert Mavericks. In 68 games with High Desert he hit .320/.384/.530 with 13 home runs in 68 games. Overall, he hit .303/.366/.464 and 16 home runs. After the season, he played in the Arizona Fall League.

Kivlehan returned to High Desert to start 2014. After hitting nine home runs in 32 games, he was promoted to the Jackson Generals.

The Mariners added him to their 40-man roster after the 2015 season.

Texas Rangers
The Texas Rangers acquired Kivlehan from the Mariners on December 2, 2015 as a player to be named later from an earlier trade that sent Leonys Martín and Anthony Bass to the Mariners and Tom Wilhelmsen and James Jones to the Rangers.

Seattle Mariners (second stint)
On May 29, 2016, Kivlehan was traded back to the Mariners for a player to be named later or cash considerations (later specified as pitcher Justin De Fratus).

San Diego Padres
On August 4, 2016, the San Diego Padres claimed Kivlehan off waivers. The Padres promoted him to the major leagues on August 20, he hit his first career home run off Robbie Ray in his second big league at bat.

Cincinnati Reds
On September 28, 2016, Kivlehan was claimed off waivers by the Cincinnati Reds. He was designated for assignment on October 6.

Kivlehan made the Reds' Opening Day roster in 2017. He was outrighted to Triple-A on November 3, 2017, and elected free agency on November 6. On November 18, Kivlehan signed a minor league contract with the Reds that included an invitation to spring training. He was released from the organization in early May 2018.

New York Mets
On May 9, 2018, Kivlehan signed a minor league contract with the New York Mets.

Arizona Diamondbacks
On September 6, 2018, the Arizona Diamondbacks acquired Kivlehan from the Mets for cash considerations. He appeared in 9 games for the Diamondbacks before he was outrighted to Triple-A on October 10. The following day, he elected free agency.

Pittsburgh Pirates

On October 31, 2018, he signed a minor league contract with the Pittsburgh Pirates.

Toronto Blue Jays
On May 10, 2019, Kivlehan was traded to the Toronto Blue Jays. He became a free agent following the 2019 season. He re-signed with Toronto on December 2, 2019. Kivlehan was released by the Blue Jays organization on August 16, 2020.

San Diego Padres (second stint)
On February 26, 2021, Kivlehan signed a minor league contract with the San Diego Padres organization that included an invitation to Spring Training. On May 12, 2021, Kivlehan was selected to the active roster. In 5 games with the Padres, Kivlehan went 1-for-4 with 2 walks and 2 RBI. On May 17, Kivlehan was returned to the Triple-A El Paso Chihuahuas.

Chicago White Sox
On February 21, 2022, Kivlehan signed a minor league contract with the Chicago White Sox. Kivlehan played in 3 games for the Triple-A Charlotte Knights, going 3-for-12 with 2 home runs and 3 RBI before he was released on April 12.

Tokyo Yakult Swallows
On April 29, 2022, Kivlehan signed a one-year, $480,000 contract with the Tokyo Yakult Swallows of Nippon Professional Baseball. He became a free agent following the 2022 season.

International career
On July 2, 2021, Kivlehan was named to the roster for the United States national baseball team for the 2020 Summer Olympics, contested in 2021 in Tokyo. The team went on to win silver, falling to Japan in the gold-medal game.

References

External links

1989 births
Living people
American football defensive backs
Arizona Diamondbacks players
Baseball players at the 2015 Pan American Games
Baseball players from New York (state)
Buffalo Bisons (minor league) players
Cincinnati Reds players
Clinton LumberKings players
El Paso Chihuahuas players
Everett AquaSox players
High Desert Mavericks players
Indianapolis Indians players
Jackson Generals (Southern League) players
Las Vegas 51s players
Louisville Bats players
Major League Baseball outfielders
New Hampshire Fisher Cats players
Nippon Professional Baseball outfielders
Pan American Games medalists in baseball
Pan American Games silver medalists for the United States
Players of American football from New York (state)
Round Rock Express players
Rutgers Scarlet Knights football players
Rutgers Scarlet Knights baseball players
Saint Joseph Regional High School alumni
San Diego Padres players
Sportspeople from the New York metropolitan area
Surprise Saguaros players
Tacoma Rainiers players
Tokyo Yakult Swallows players
United States national baseball team players
Medalists at the 2015 Pan American Games
Baseball players at the 2020 Summer Olympics
Olympic baseball players of the United States
Medalists at the 2020 Summer Olympics
Olympic silver medalists for the United States in baseball